Justice Olcott may refer to:

Peter Olcott, associate justice of the Vermont Supreme Court
Simeon Olcott, chief judge of the Superior Court of New Hampshire